Teunissen is a Dutch patronymic surname meaning "son of Teunis", a nickname for Anthonius. People with this surname include:

Bert Teunissen (born 1959), Dutch photographer
 (born 1981), Dutch ice hockey player
Christine Teunissen (born 1985), Dutch politician
 (1898-1975), Dutch film director 
Jo Teunissen-Waalboer  (1919–1991), Dutch javelin thrower
Mike Teunissen (born 1992), Dutch road cyclist and cyclo-cross racer

See also
Teunissen-Cremers syndrome, a genetic disorder
Theunissen (surname)

Dutch-language surnames
Patronymic surnames
Surnames from given names